Nujin Rural District is a rural district (dehestan) in the Central District of Farashband County, Fars Province, Iran. At the 2006 census, its population (including Nujin, which was subsequently detached from the rural district and promoted to city status) was 6,839, in 1,526 families; excluding Nujin, the population (as of 2006) was 3,843, in 754 families.  The rural district has 11 villages.

References 

Rural Districts of Fars Province
Farashband County